was a Japanese writer and Japanese Communist Party (JCP) politician.

Nakano was born in Maruoka, now part of Sakai, Fukui. In 1914 he enrolled in middle school in Fukui, Fukui, and attended high school in Hiratsuka, Kanagawa and Kanazawa, Ishikawa. In 1924 he entered the German literature department of the University of Tokyo. In 1931 he joined the Japanese Communist Party, for which he was arrested in 1934. Immediately after World War II he rejoined the party, and played a leading role in founding the JCP-affiliated literary society New Japanese Literature Association (Shin Nihon Bungakkai). In 1947, Nakano began a three-year term as elected representative to the government. In 1958 he was elected to the party's Central Committee, but in 1964 was expelled due to political conflicts.

His autobiographical novels include Nami no aima (Between the Waves, 1930), Muragimo (In the Depths of the Heart, 1954), and Kō otsu hei tei (ABCD, 1965-1969). Nakano received the 1959 Yomiuri Prize for Nashi no hana.

References 
 Miriam Silverberg, Changing Song: The Marxist Manifestos of Nakano Shigeharu, Princeton University Press, 1990. .
 Donald Keene, Dawn to the West: Japanese literature of the modern era, fiction, Volume 1, 2nd edition, Columbia University Press, 1998, pages 881-883. .
 J. Thomas Rimer and Van C. Gessel, Modern Japanese literature, Columbia University Press, 2005, page 604. .
 Japanese Wikipedia article

1902 births
1979 deaths
People from Sakai, Fukui
Japanese Communist Party politicians
Japanese prisoners and detainees
Japanese writers
Marxist writers
Politicians from Fukui Prefecture
Writers from Fukui Prefecture
Yomiuri Prize winners
Japanese Marxists